Born to Fly is the third studio album by American country music artist Sara Evans. It was released in October 2000 via RCA Records Nashville. The album produced four singles with its title track, "I Could Not Ask for More" (a cover of an Edwin McCain song), "Saints & Angels", and "I Keep Looking", all of which reached within the Top 20 on the US Billboard Hot Country Songs chart. The title track reached number one, "I Could Not Ask for More" and "I Keep Looking" both broke the Top 5 at numbers 2 and 5 respectively, and "Saints & Angels" peaked at number 16. Born to Fly has been Evans' highest-selling album to date, having been certified 2× Platinum by the Recording Industry Association of America (RIAA) for U.S. sales of two million copies. The album was also one of the most successful of the year. Evans was nominated for five CMA Awards: Album of the Year; song, single, and music video (for the title-track); and Female Vocalist of the Year. She won her first CMA award for music video of the year. The international version of the album includes a bonus track, "You", which was later released in North America as a bonus track on her 2005 album Real Fine Place. Born to Fly was a defining album for Evans. Her earlier albums had more of a neotraditional country sound, while all of her later albums had a more crossover-friendly country pop sound, similar to Martina McBride and Faith Hill.

Track listing

Personnel 
Compiled from liner notes.

 Sara Evans – lead vocals, backing vocals 
 Steve Nathan – acoustic piano, Rhodes piano, Hammond B3 organ, synthesizers
 Matt Rollings – Hammond B3 organ
 Tim Lauer – accordion
 Bruce Hornsby – acoustic piano, Wurlitzer organ
 Dan Dugmore – acoustic guitar, steel guitar
 Marcus Hummon – acoustic guitar
 B. James Lowry – acoustic guitar
 Randy Scruggs – acoustic guitar, banjo
 Biff Watson – acoustic guitar, bouzouki, mandolin
 Paul Worley – acoustic guitar, 12-string acoustic guitar, electric guitars, electric rhythm guitar, six-string bass
 Jerry McPherson – electric guitars, electric rhythm guitar 
 Jerry Douglas – dobro
 Robby Turner – steel guitar
 Aubrey Haynie – fiddle
 Jonathan Yudkin – fiddle, mandolin
 Glenn Worf – bass 
 Matt Chamberlain – drums
 Karen Winkelman – string arrangements and orchestrations 
 The Nashville String Machine – strings
 Wes Hightower – backing vocals 
 Troy Johnson – backing vocals 
 Lesley Evans Lyons – backing vocals 
 Melody Schelske – backing vocals 
 Ashley Evans Simpson – backing vocals 
 Ricky Skaggs – backing vocals

Production 
 Sara Evans – producer 
 Paul Worley – producer
 Clarke Schleicher – recording, mixing, additional recording
 Todd Gunnerson – additional recording, recording assistant 
 Erik Hellerman – additional recording, recording assistant, mix assistant 
 Mike Poole – additional recording
 Sandy Williams – additional recording, recording assistant 
 Wade Hachler – recording assistant 
 Rich Hanson – mix assistant
 Eric Conn – digital editing
 Carlos Grier – digital editing
 Denny Purcell – mastering
 Paige Connors – production coordinator 
 S. Wade Hunt – art direction 
 Missy McKeand – design 
 Andrew Eccles – photography 
 Joel Green – hair stylist 
 Mary Beth Felts – make-up
 Claudia Fowler – wardrobe stylist 
 Brenner Van Meter – management
 Mixed at Loud Recording (Nashville, Tennessee).
 Mastered at Georgetown Masters (Nashville, Tennessee).

Charts

Weekly charts

Year-end charts

Singles

Certifications

References

2000 albums
Sara Evans albums
RCA Records albums
Albums produced by Paul Worley